Sutton (south settlement or south town in Old English) may refer to:

Places

United Kingdom
England

In alphabetical order by county:
 Sutton, Bedfordshire
 Sutton, Berkshire, a location
 Sutton-in-the-Isle, Ely, Cambridgeshire
 Sutton, Peterborough, Cambridgeshire
 Sutton, Newton, Cheshire
 Sutton, Cheshire East, a civil parish in Cheshire
 Sutton Lane Ends, a village in Cheshire
 Sutton Weaver, Cheshire West and Chester
 Great Sutton, Ellesmere Port, Cheshire
 Guilden Sutton, Chester, Cheshire
 Little Sutton, Cheshire, Ellesmere Port
 Sutton on the Hill, Derbyshire
 Sutton Scarsdale, Derbyshire
 Sutton, Devon, a hamlet near Kingsbridge
 Sutton, a historic name of Plymouth, Devon
 Sutton Harbour, Plymouth, Devon
 Sutton Waldron, Dorset
 Sutton, Essex
 Long Sutton, Hampshire
 Sutton Scotney, Hampshire
 Sutton, Herefordshire
 East Sutton, Kent
 Sutton, Kent
 Sutton-at-Hone and Hawley, Dartford, Kent
 Sutton Valence, Maidstone, Kent
 Sutton Hastings
 Town Sutton
 Sutton Cheney, Leicestershire
 Sutton in the Elms, near Broughton Astley, Leicestershire
 Sutton, Lincolnshire, a location
 Sutton Bridge, Lincolnshire
 Sutton-on-Sea, part of Mablethorpe and Sutton, Lincolnshire
 Long Sutton, Lincolnshire
 Sutton, London (in Surrey until 1965)
 London Borough of Sutton 
 Sutton, St Helens, Merseyside
 Sutton, a former village in Middlesex (now part of Heston)
 Sutton, Norfolk
 Sutton cum Lound, Nottinghamshire
 Sutton-cum-Granby, Nottinghamshire
 Sutton-in-Ashfield, Nottinghamshire
 Sutton-on-Trent, Nottinghamshire
 Sutton Bonington, Rushcliffe, Nottinghamshire
Sutton Bonington Campus of the University of Nottingham
 Sutton, Oxfordshire, a location
 Sutton Courtenay, Oxfordshire (formerly in Berkshire)
 Sutton, Chelmarsh, a location in Shropshire
 Sutton, Shrewsbury, a location in Shropshire
 Sutton, West Felton, a location in Shropshire
 Sutton upon Tern, Shropshire
 Sutton Bingham, Yeovil, Somerset
 Sutton, Somerset
 Long Sutton, Somerset
 Sutton, Staffordshire, a location
 Sutton, Suffolk
 Sutton Hoo near Woodbridge, Suffolk
 Sutton Coldfield, Birmingham, West Midlands
Sutton Park, West Midlands 
Sutton Coldfield transmitting station
 Sutton Trinity (ward), an electoral ward in Birmingham
 Sutton, East Sussex, part of Seaford
 Sutton, West Sussex, Chichester
 Sutton-under-Brailes, Warwickshire
 Sutton Benger, Wiltshire
 Full Sutton, East Riding of Yorkshire
 Sutton upon Derwent, East Riding of Yorkshire
 Sutton-on-Hull, East Riding of Yorkshire
 Sutton, Selby, North Yorkshire
 Sutton, a place in the parish of Ellington High and Low, formerly in Healey with Sutton, North Yorkshire
 Sutton Bank, North Yorkshire
 Sutton Grange, North Yorkshire
 Sutton-in-Craven, North Yorkshire
 Sutton-on-the-Forest, North Yorkshire
Sutton Park, North Yorkshire 
 Sutton Howgrave, North Yorkshire
 Sutton-under-Whitestonecliffe, North Yorkshire
 Sutton, South Yorkshire

Wales
 Sutton, Pembrokeshire, a location
 Sutton, Vale of Glamorgan

Australia
 Sutton, New South Wales
 Sutton Forest, New South Wales

Canada
 Sutton, Ontario
 Sutton, Quebec
 Sutton Island (Nunavut)
 Sutton Range, Vancouver Island, British Columbia
 Rural Municipality of Sutton No. 103, Saskatchewan

Ireland
 Sutton, Dublin

New Zealand
 Sutton, New Zealand, in Otago
 Sutton Salt Lake, in Otago

United States
 Sutton-Alpine, Alaska
 Sutton, Massachusetts
 Sutton, Nebraska
 Sutton, New Hampshire
 Sutton, New Jersey
 Sutton, North Dakota
 Sutton, Vermont, a New England town
 Sutton (CDP), Vermont, village in the town
 Sutton, West Virginia
 Sutton County, Texas
 Sutton Island, Maine
 Sutton Township (disambiguation) - two places
 Suttons Bay Township, Michigan
 Suttons Bay, Michigan

People 
Sutton (given name)
Sutton (surname) for a list of people with the surname Sutton
Sutton Foster, American actress, singer
Sutton Smith (born 1996), American football player
Sutton Mercer, a fictional character from the Sara Sherpard series: The Lying Game
Sutton Brady, a fictional character from the Freeform series: The Bold Type

Football Clubs
Bishop Sutton A.F.C.
Long Sutton Athletic F.C.
Sutton Athletic F.C.
Sutton Coldfield Town F.C.
Sutton Common Rovers F.C.
Sutton Town A.F.C.
Sutton United F.C.

Other uses
Sutton (constructor), Formula One racing car constructor in 1959
Sutton Place (disambiguation), the name of a number of streets, neighbourhoods and estates
Sutton Publishing, part of The History Press
Sutton station (disambiguation)
Sutton Time, a division of E. Gluck Corporation
USS Sutton, the name of more than one United States Navy ship
Sutton Group, Canadian real estate franchiser
Sutton Vale, fictional workplace on Doctors

See also